Firdaus Kanga , born in Mumbai 1960 to a Parsi Family, Kanga is an Indian writer, journalist and actor who currently lives in London. He has written a novel Trying to Grow a semi-autobiographical novel set in India  and a travel book ''Heaven on Wheels'', which shares about his experiences in United Kingdom where he met Stephen Hawking. A film was based on his novel Trying to Grow with the name of Sixth Happiness, where he himself played the role of a screenwriter and the lead character.

Kanga was born with a rare disease called Osteogenesis imperfecta or brittle bones disease.

References

External links

Article by Kanga on the BBC website
Sixth Happiness -- a BBC-BFI film that won the EMMA award
Article about Kanga and his film on the website for The Independent newspaper
Trying to Grow by Kanga -- republished in November 2008 by Penguin India
New York Times review of Kanga's film Sixth Happiness
Kanga in a New York Times review of the history of homosexuality in Indian literary history

1960 births
British gay writers
Indian LGBT novelists
Indian LGBT journalists
Indian LGBT rights activists
People with osteogenesis imperfecta
British people of Parsi descent
Living people
Gay novelists
Gay journalists
Indian emigrants to England
Writers from Mumbai
Parsi writers
LGBT Zoroastrians
British LGBT novelists
Parsi people from Mumbai